The raid on Barii was a military operation conducted by SEAL Team Six (DEVGRU) in support of an operation being carried out by the Somali National Army. The raid resulted in the death of DEVGRU Senior Chief Petty Officer Kyle Milliken, marking the first US serviceman combat death in Somalia since the First Battle of Mogadishu in 1993, also known as "Black Hawk Down".

Events
The DEVGRU operators were conducting an operation with Somali commandos to target a local leader of al-Shabaab in Darusalam village, where Abdirahman Mohamed Warsame, known as Mahad Karate, was believed to be hiding. 

In addition to the dead DEVGRU operator, at least two other Americans were wounded, including a Somali-American interpreter. At least three Al-Shabaab militants also died plus another local Al-Shabaab commander. The mission was aborted soon after insurgents opened fire. The American/Somali group quickly returned to the aircraft that had taken it to the area and was evacuated.

References 

Conflicts in 2017
2017 in Somalia
Somali Civil War (2009–present)
May 2017 events in Africa